The  Hillcrest Park Archway in Clovis, New Mexico is an archway over a roadway entering into Hillcrest Park which was built during 1939 to 1940.  It was a Works Progress Administration project.  It was listed on the National Register of Historic Places in 2008.

"Improved by the Works Progress Administration" and "1935" shows on a photographed plaque on the archway;  it seems that date refers to WPA improvements to the Hillcrest Park, not the archway itself.

References

National Register of Historic Places in Curry County, New Mexico
Buildings and structures completed in 1939
Clovis, New Mexico
Works Progress Administration in New Mexico
Arches and vaults in the United States